Gabarain or Gabaráin is a surname of Basque origin. Notable people with the surname include:

Cesáreo Gabaráin (1936–1991), Spanish priest and composer
Iker Gabarain (born 1977), Spanish footballer

Basque-language surnames